Sekolah Menengah Kebangsaan Agama (SMKA) or National Islamic Secondary School is a type of institutional group of education established and managed by the Malaysian Ministry of Education (MOE). SMKA forms Religious Education Institution (IPA) with two other types of institutional group of education, which are Government-funded Religious School (SABK) and normal secondary schools with Religious Stream Class (KAA)

History 
An idea to establish SMKA was inspired by the then MOE Director for Islamic Education, Nik Mohammed Mohyideen Wan Musa. It was coincide with the aspiration of MOE and the Muslim community who realised its benefit. Several efforts were made before, including assistance to independent Islamic schools and recommendation to them to apply new system.

The establishment of SMKA was in line with the effort to modernise Malaysian education system on that time. Improvements of Islamic education system in Islamic schools were in accordance with current developments as well. Thus, an idea inspired by Nik Mohammed Mohyideen was turned to reality by Dr. Abdul Hamid Othman and Zainal Abidin Abdul Kadir, both were top officials responsible for Islamic affairs in Malaysia.

In 1970s, independent Islamic schools were not received well from the public due to unorganised administrative system and the lack of facilities, while the people's awareness towards education increased at the same time. Therefore, MOE consulted with state governments in Peninsular Malaysia to adjust administrative and curricular system in Islamic schools with those in daily schools.

Most of Islamic schools, before this, emphasise Islamic studies and Arabic language too much without giving attention to other subjects available in daily schools like science, mathematics, geography and history. This was due to the inability of Islamic schools to provide laboratories. Consequently, graduates of Islamic schools were less competitive in human resources market and current challenges faced by the people.

In 1977, MOE established SMKA, took over 11 state and independent Islamic schools and gave them the status of SMKA. Since then, the number of SMKAs has increased due to the building and opening of new SMKAs all over Malaysia (like a number of SMKAs in Malaysia) and promotion of status from normal secondary school to SMKA (as in the case of SMKA Tun Perak in Jasin, Melaka which was a normal secondary school before 2012).

However, a small number of SMKAs have lost its status due to promotion of status to a Fully Residential School (like SBPI Jempol in Batu Kikir, Negeri Sembilan, which was previously SMKA Jempol sometimes in 2002) and return to the respective State Government (as in the case of SMKA Tun Ahmad Zaidi in Kuching, Sarawak in 2012).

, Malaysia has 60 SMKAs. The newest SMKAs opened in Malaysia have been SMKA Pagoh, Johor (which was opened in January 2018) and SMKA Jerlun, Kedah (which was opened in January 2019).

Features 
SMKA is different comparing to other secondary schools. SMKA is a place for those who want to learn and practice Islamic culture, not only through the teaching and learning of Arabic language, Jawi and Quranic skills, but also activities applying Islamic values. SMKA students, upon their graduation, have a wide chance to further their studies locally and internationally in various fields. Consequently, SMKA will be able not only to produce wise and accountable Islamic preacher, but also to produce experts who understand Islam.

Admission 

Admission of new students to SMKAs are executed by the State Education Department's Islamic Education Sector and is open to all Muslim students studying in Malaysian public and private schools. Requirements may be different according to the need of such state, but a general and centralised instruction on admission to SMKAs was provided by the MOE Islamic Education Division. As a small number of SMKAs hold Tahfiz Model Ulul Albab (TMUA) additional status, candidates need to be able to memorise a page of al-Quran in 45 to 50 minutes.

Form 1 
A candidate must be not more than 13 years old in age, get a good result in Primary School Evaluation Test or equivalent, pass Fardhu Ain Basic Test (PAFA) conducted in Standard 6, active in co-curricular activities in Standard 6, be able to read al-Quran and write Jawi script, know how to perform Salah and pass the Entrance Test.

Form 4
A candidate must be not more than 16 years old in age, get a good result in Form 3 Assessment (including at least Grade B in Arabic Language and Islamic Education subjects), pass PAFA conducted in Form 3, active in co-curricular activities, be able to read al-Quran and write Jawi script, know how to perform Salah and pass the Entrance Test.

Lower Form 6 
A candidate must be between 17 and 20 years old in age, pass in Malaysian Certificate of Education examination (including at least Grade B in Malay and History subjects and at least Grade E in Quran and Sunnah Studies, Sharia Education and Arabic Language subjects) and pass PAFA conducted in Form 5.

List of SMKA 
, SMKAs are as follows:

References

Secondary schools in Malaysia